Lansing Charter Township is a charter township of Ingham County in the U.S. state of Michigan.  The population was 8,143 at the 2020 census.  

The township consists of six non-contiguous sections bordered mostly by the cities of East Lansing and Lansing.  The CDP of Edgemont Park is located in the north end of the western section of the township.

History
The first white settler to purchase land in the township was Jacob F. Cooley in 1837. The township was organized in 1842 in the northwest corner of Ingham County and was named after the hometown of one of the township's original settlers. The township experienced its first loss of land in 1859 when the unincorporated settlement of Lansing officially incorporated as a city out of seven square miles near the center of the township.

On April 1, 1963, township voters voted to become a charter township, which provides for streamlined administration, expanded taxing authority, and added protection from annexation.

Geography

Description
The cities of Lansing and East Lansing have incorporated much of the land that formerly constituted the township reducing the township from its original  to its current  in six disconnected land areas.

The western section of the township is the largest, and traditionally included many of the township's industrial developments, including the large General Motors Lansing Craft Center and neighboring Lansing Metal Center automobile factories, both of which were closed in early 2006 and demolished in 2008. A Superfund site, the former site of Adams Plating, is also located in this part of the township. Also in the western part are the former Waverly Golf Course and the adjacent Michigan Avenue Park. The properties were sold for commercial and residential redevelopment in 2018.  The CDP (census-designated place) of Edgemont Park is also located in this section of the township north of Saginaw Street (M-43) .

The northeastern section of the township is heavily industrialized west of Wood Road. However, since 2002, thea area east of Wood Road has been developed as the 'downtown' of the township with the construction of the Eastwood Towne Center, one of the largest shopping malls in Metropolitan Lansing. The township created the Lansing Township Downtown Development Authority (DDA) in May 2003 to capture local property taxes for infrastructure development of the district.

The eastern sections of the township are mostly residential neighborhoods, though commercial development lines Grand River Avenue, Michigan Avenue, Kalamazoo Street and both sides of US-127. The northern portions of these sections include parts of the Groesbeck neighborhood north Grand River Avenue and east of Wood Road. The southern portion includes part of the Urbandale neighborhood.

The southeastern section of the township is zoned exclusively for agricultural development, and contains research farms for Michigan State University, including the Dairy Cattle Teaching and Research Center, Horse Teaching and Research Center, Entomology Field Research Lab, and Botany Field Research Lab. This section also contains one privately-owned farm along East Jolly Road.

Demographics

2020 census
As of the census of 2020, there were 8,143 people in the township. The racial makeup of the township was 68.3% White (66.7 non-hispanic White), 13.5% African American, 0.6% Native American, 2.9% Asian, 0.0% Pacific Islander, 3.5% from other races, and 11.1% from two or more races. Hispanic or Latino of any race were 12.8% of the population.

2010 census
As of the census of 2010, there were 8,126 people, 3,929 households, and 1,897 families residing in the township. The racial makeup of the township was 76.3% White, 12.5% African American, 0.5% Native American, 2.6% Asian, 0.0% Pacific Islander, 3.5% from other races, and 4.7% from two or more races. Hispanic or Latino of any race were 10.9% of the population.

2000 census
There were 4,104 households, out of which 22.8% had children under the age of 18 living with them, 34.3% were married couples living together, 12.6% had a female householder with no husband present, and 50.1% were non-families. 40.1% of all households were made up of individuals, and 10.1% had someone living alone who was 65 years of age or older. The average household size was 2.05 and the average family size was 2.78.

In the township the population was spread out, with 20.9% under the age of 18, 11.3% from 18 to 24, 32.9% from 25 to 44, 20.8% from 45 to 64, and 14.1% who were 65 years of age or older. The median age was 35 years. For every 100 females, there were 87.7 males. For every 100 females age 18 and over, there were 83.1 males.

The median income for a household in the township was $41,017, and the median income for a family was $50,632. Males had a median income of $37,124 versus $28,829 for females. The per capita income for the township was $22,885. About 5.2% of families and 7.5% of the population were below the poverty line, including 8.2% of those under age 18 and 4.7% of those age 65 or over.

Government
Lansing Township operates under the charter township form of government, which has a township board of trustees vested with legislative and executive powers and duties. The board consists of an elected township supervisor, clerk and treasurer with four additional trustees.

References

Further reading
 Balaskovitz, Andy. "Despite hurdles, consolidating Lansing, East Lansing and Lansing Township makes sense." Lansing City Pulse. Wednesday, November 28, 2012. News section. Available on NewsBank, Record Number: 33658e6f3e435749c466e59bf44dd1b692752.

External links
Official Website of the Charter Township of Lansing
Eastwood Downtown Development Authority

Townships in Ingham County, Michigan
Charter townships in Michigan
Lansing–East Lansing metropolitan area
1842 establishments in Michigan
Populated places established in 1842